Parliamentary elections were held in Kiribati on 26 March 1982, with a second round on 1 April. All candidates for the 36 seats ran as independents. In the constituency of Banaba there was only one candidate, who was returned without an election taking place. Voter turnout was 82.5%.

Results

References

Kiribati
1982 in Kiribati
Elections in Kiribati
Non-partisan elections